In robust statistics, repeated median regression, also known as the repeated median estimator, is a robust linear regression algorithm.
The estimator has a breakdown point of 50%. Although it is equivariant under scaling, or under linear transformations of either its explanatory variable or its response variable, it is not under affine transformations that combine both variables. It can be calculated in  time by brute force, in  time using more sophisticated techniques, or in  randomized expected time. It may also be calculated using an on-line algorithm with  update time.

Method 

The repeated median method estimates the slope of the regression line  for a set of points  as

The estimated Y-axis intercept is defined as

See also 
 Theil–Sen estimator

References 

Robust regression
Statistical algorithms